The Hello Bitches Tour (stylized as Hello Bi+ches Tour) was the debut concert tour of South Korean singer CL. The tour visited nine cities in 2016 in the United States and Canada, kicking off in New York City's Hammerstein Ballroom on October 29 and concluding in Toronto at the Sound Academy on November 14. The tour was promoted by SIVA Entertainment Group. The setlist consisted of her solo songs along with many of her previous works with K-pop girl group 2NE1.

Background and development
On September 23, 2016, YG Entertainment announced that CL would hold her first American tour. She will visit nine cities in North America, with a total of nine shows. The tour's name derives from CL's 2015 Korean language single "Hello Bitches". The tour's announcement followed the release of CL's debut American single "Lifted" on August 19, amid news of an upcoming English-language debut EP. The sold-out show at the Hammerstein Ballroom  made her the first Korean female singer to play a solo concert at a major venue in New York City. An unreleased music video of "Hello Bitches" was also played during the tour.

Controversy
On November 7, fans and concertgoers had noticed that CL had been using the "controversial" version of her song "MTBD (Mental Breakdown)" since the tour started. CL apologized on her Twitter account stating that her "engineer [had] sent the old version for [the] tour". CL performed the alternative version for the later shows.

Set list

 "Fire" (Intro)  
 "Can't Nobody"
 "Scream"
 "I Am the Best"
 "Come Back Home" 
 "I Don't Care (Reggae Ver.)"
 "Gotta Be You"
 "Falling in Love"
 "Lonely"
 "Missing You" 
 "If I Were You"
 "I Love You" 
 "The Baddest Female" 
 "Doctor Pepper"
 "Dirty Vibe"
 "MTBD"
 "Lifted"
 "Hello Bitches"
Encore
 "Do You Love Me"
 "I Am The Best (Remix)"

Tour dates

References 

2016 concert tours